Ross McLaren is a Canadian artist and filmmaker based in New York City.

Biography

McLaren was born in 1953 in Sudbury, Ontario, Canada and graduated with honors from Ontario College of Art, where he also did post-graduate work. He is faculty at Cooper Union, Fordham University and Pratt Institute, and also taught at Millennium Film Workshop in New York City.

Work

Advocacy

Since 1976, McLaren has worked as a filmmaker, scholar, teacher, curator, critic, and community organizer.  He founded and was first director of the Funnel Film Centre in Toronto, Ontario, Canada, an institution devoted to the production, exhibition, and distribution of film.  As founder/director, McLaren encouraged continued recognition of film—particularly Super 8—in his native country.

Films

His films include: Crash 'n' Burn: the "self-destructive document of Toronto’s eponymous punk club," Wave, Weather Building, Dance of the Sacred Foundation Application (feat. Jack Smith), Sex Without Glasses, and the Ann Arbor Film Festival award-winning sensation Summer Camp.

A recipient of such prestigious grants as Ontario and Canada Council awards, McLaren has shown his works worldwide.  His films screened at MoMA, Anthology Film Archives, the Menil Collection, the National Film Theatre in London, the Centre Georges Pompidou, the Biennale du Paris, Documenta VI, Jyväskylä University in Finland, and ARKEN Museum of Modern Art in Denmark.  His work, which was presented in such esteemed venues as the Edinburgh, Toronto, and Oberhausen Film Festivals, is found in several permanent collections, including that of the American Federation of Arts, New York, the Arts Council of Great Britain, the Art Gallery of Ontario, Toronto, Ottawa’s National Film Archives and the National Gallery of Canada.

Selected filmography

 Winning, 40 min (2005)
 Wave, 5 min. (2004)
 Dance of the Sacred Foundation Application (feat. Jack Smith), 15 min. (2003)
 Lapland, 3 min. (2002)
 Muted Horn, Squeaky Stool, 9:11 min. (2001)
 Another Story, S-8, 5 min. (1988)
 Spin, 16mm, 1 min. (1987)
 Warehouse Eyes, S-8 & 16mm, 13 min. (1986)
 Tilt, S-8, 3 min. (1985)
 Let's Run Amok, S-8, 3 min. (1984)
 Sex Without Glasses, 16mm 12:30 min. (1983)
 Calgary Girls, S-8, 5 min. (1983)
 Launch 5ive, S-8, 2:38 min. (1982)
 9 X 12, 16mm, 1 min., (also microfiche insert for Impulse Magazine) (1979–81)
 Wednesday, January 17, 1979, 16mm, 4:40 min. (1979)
 Snorkel, 16mm. 10:10 min. (1976–79)
 Summer Camp, 16mm, 60 min. (1978)
 Crash 'n' Burn, 16mm, 27:45 (1977)
 I.E., 16mm, 14:45 min. (1976)
 Weather Building, 16mm, 10:15 min. (1976) (features weather beacon on the Canada Life Building)
 Baby Green, S-8, 10:15 min. (1974)

Academic appointments

 Ontario College of Art, Toronto
 The Funnel Film Theatre, Toronto
 Fanshawe College, Fine Arts Dep’t., London
 The Cooper Union School of Art, New York
 Millennium Film Workshop, New York
 Fordham University: College at Lincoln Center, New York
 Koulu Lapland, Finland
 Pratt Institute, Brooklyn

Selected awards and distinctions

 Albert Frank Toronto - Amsterdam Artist's Award
 Ann Arbor Film Festival Award (multiple)
 Black Maria Film Festival - Director's Citation
 Canada Council Grant, London Film Festival
 Canada Council Film Production Grant
 Ontario Arts Council Film Production Grant
 Ontario Arts Council Visual Arts Grant
 Parabola Arts Foundation Film Distribution Project

See also

 Canada Life Building
 Crash 'n' Burn
 Diodes
 Punk film
 Stiv Bators
 Weather beacon

References and sources

Further reading
 Allan, Blaine.  "Toronto: A Play of History," 1987
 Allan, Blaine.  "The Funnel," NFT, Kingston, 1981
 Birnie.  "Canadian Experimental Film in the 70's," 1978
 Bruce, B.   "Cinema of Transgression," Cine Action 5, 1986
  “En Garde,” The Independent Eye, vol.10 #3, 1989
 Ensom.  "Toronto Festival Celebrates Super 8," 1977
 Fleming.  "Filming Buildings, Building Films," Parachute, 1981
 Fleming.  "Light at the End of the Funnel," Fuse, vol. 4, 1980
 Gronau.  "Magic, Witchcraft and Film", Parallelogram, 1982
 Hall.  "A Funnel for Talent," Cinema Canada, #52, 1979
 Kelly, B.  "Punk At The Movies," Graffiti #2, vol.#4, 1986
 London Art Gallery.  "Uncommon Language." London Art Gallery: London, 1984
 MacDonald, Scott.  “A Critical Cinema 3: Interviews With Independent Filmmakers,” University of California, 1998
 Marchessault, Janine.  “Film Scenes: Paris, New York, Toronto,” Public, Issue 22/23, York University Press, Toronto, 2003
 Marras.  "McLaren's Films," Art Communication #4, 1977
 Mays, J. B.  "Cache Du Cinema," Toronto Globe & Mail, 1985
 McBride-Glassman.  "The Displaced Narrator," 1985
 National Gallery of Canada.  "Filmmakers Series IV," National Gallery: Ottawa, 1980
 O’Connor, Alan.  “Local Scenes and Dangerous Crossroads: Punk and Theories of Cultural Hybridity,” Popular Music Vol. 21/2, Cambridge University Press, London: 225-36, 2002
 Povere.  "Moving Pictures In A Gallery," Ottawa Revue, Ottawa, 1980
 Savage & Berlin.  "McLaren at the Funnel," Hide,  #3, 1983
 Scott, Jay.  "Movies Made Personal," Toronto Globe & Mail, 1979
 Springer.  "Creemedia," Creem vol. 10, #4, 1978
 Wado.	"Ontario Film Series," Cinema Parallele, 1980
 Wlaschin, K.  "Rock Movies in the 70's," British Film Institute: London, 1978

External links
 The Cooper Union
  Fordham University, New York, NY
  Millennium Film Workshop, New York, NY
 Porter, John.  "A History of 8mm and Super 8 Film in Toronto."  First published in Pop Off: The Regular 8 Faction, YYZ Artists' Outlet: Toronto, 1998.
  Pratt Institute, Brooklyn, NY

1953 births
Living people
People from Greater Sudbury
Canadian experimental filmmakers
Film directors from Ontario
Canadian video artists
Artists from Ontario